ARMAN FM is a general entertainment commercial radio station in Afghanistan. It broadcasts 24/7 in Dari and Pashto and is also available on live stream on ARMAN FM's website.

History
ARMAN FM takes its name from the Dari/Pashto word that means “hope” and changed the media landscape in Afghanistan since launch early 2003. It was the country's first ever commercial radio station.

The stations attention boomed with its audiences' love to music and enthusiasm for change. ARMAN FM's programs are very diverse bringing the latest music from Afghanistan and around the world to the listeners. The shows are presented by some of the hottest and young RJs in the country including men and women. A format that was essential when the station launched with a style that is being replicated across competitive and governmental stations. 
Its entertainment-focused programs indicate the young global trends, featuring local, regional and international music. Chatting and engaging with the listeners and presenting the latest news, are also part of ARMAN FM's focus.
Radio continues to be the most popular form of media in Afghanistan, accessed by 90% of population. ARMAN FM's target audiences are the private industry, NGOs and Government. Advertisers include Akira, Alekozay, Coke, Counter Narcotics Department, Continental Biscuits, ISAF, LG, Nestle, Roshan, UNFPA, UNICEF, Unilever and Western Union, amongst others.

Arman FM suspended its programs after the Taliban takeover on 15th of August, 2021 and started relaying Ariana News audio.

Arman FM was back on air with own programming on November 16, 2021 but musical and entertainment programs are reduced, western pop songs are removed, religious contents are expanded.

Schedule (Before 15.08.2021)

References

Radio stations in Afghanistan
Mass media in Kabul